Guardian, in comics, may refer to:

 Guardian (DC Comics), the alias of Jim Harper, a costumed hero
 Guardian (Marvel Comics), the alias of James Hudson, a superhero
 Guardian, the alias of Heather Hudson, wife of James Hudson, better known as Vindicator
 Guardians, a Marvel Comics series

It may also refer to:
 Guardian angel (comics), the superhero alias of Hop Harrigan
 Guardians of the Galaxy, two Marvel Comics teams
 Guardians of the Galaxy (1969 team)
 Guardians of the Galaxy (2008 team)
 Guardians of the Universe, DC Comics aliens who are behind the Green Lantern Corps
 New Guardians, a DC Comics team picked by the Guardians of the Universe
 Global Guardians, a DC Comics superhero team
 Guardian (Mal Duncan), also known as Vox, Hornblower, and the Herald, a DC Comics superhero

See also
 Guardian (disambiguation)

References

fr:Guardian